Edward III of Bar (late June 1377  – 25 October 1415) was made Marquis of Pont-à-Mousson by his father Robert I, Duke of Bar in 1399 (his mother was Mary of France, daughter of John II of France) and held it until his death. He then became heir to the Duchy of Bar following the death of his elder brothers Henry and Philippe at or soon after the Battle of Nicopolis in 1396.

In 1405, Charles VI of France charged him with defending the Boulonnais, then threatened by the English.  At the end of 1406 he participated in the Guyenne campaign under the orders of Louis of Orleans, but dysentery decimated the French forces.  After Louis's assassination in 1407, Edward joined John the Fearless and rallied the Burgundians.  Succeeding his father on 12 April 1411, Edward was killed at the battle of Agincourt and succeeded by his brother (he never married, though he left several illegitimate children).

References

Sources
 Georges Poull, La Maison souveraine et ducale de Bar, 1994
 Barbara Tuchman, A Distant Mirror, 1978, Alfred A. Knopf, New York

1377 births
1415 deaths
People of the Hundred Years' War
Dukes of Bar